FC Iskra-Stal Rîbnița is a Moldovan football club based in Rîbnița, Moldova (Transnistria).

History
FC Iskra-Stal (Rybnitsa) was founded in 2005 by merging an amateur team Stal that was owned by the metallurgical plant in Rîbnița, with the local team "Iskra", that was competing in the Moldovan "A" Division. In the 2005–2006 season Iskra-Stal took the second place in the "A" championship of Moldova and won a ticket for the national premier division. Head coach of this achievement was Vasily Raiko.

In the 2006–2007 season Iskra-Stal debuted in the National Division and finished 9th from 10 teams. Head coach was Serghei Sîrbu.

In 2007 the club was transformed into an autonomous non-profit organization "FC Iskra-Stal".

In the 2007–2008 season Iskra-Stal concluded the championship on 6th place among 11 teams and became one of the stronger teams in National Division. Head coach Vlad Goian was replaced by Victor Baryshev.

In the 2008–2009 season, Iskra-Stal for the first time in the history of the football in Ribnita, won the bronze medals in the championship of Moldova (3rd place) and won the right to take part in games Europa League. Some of the players of the squad in that season played in the National team of Moldova: Artur Ioniță, Serghei Alexeev, Vitali Manaliu.

In the 2009–2010 season Iskra-Stal won the silver medal (2nd place) in the National Division and for the second time received the right to participate in the Europa League.

In 2011 Iskra-Stal participated in the CIS Cup, held in St. Petersburg. The team played in Group A along with the Inter Baku, Istiqlol Dushanbe and Neftchi Kochkor. Iskra-Stal took third place, earning 4 points in the group.

At the end of the 2010–2011 season Iskra-Stal won the Moldovan Cup, winning the first trophy in its history, and qualifying for the third consecutive time into Europa League. After financial problems after the 2012/2013 season, the club was relegated to the Moldovan Second division.

Honours
Divizia Națională
Runners-up: 2009–10
Moldovan Cup
Winners: 2010–11
Moldovan Super Cup:
Runners-up: 2011

European record
UEFA Europa League

Commonwealth of Independent States Cup

List of seasons

Managers
 Serghei Sîrbu (June 2006 – June 7)
 Vlad Goian (Jan 2008 – Dec 10)
 Iurie Blonari (Jan 2011 – Nov 12)
 Veaceslav Rusnac (Nov 2012–)

See also
 2009–10 FC Iskra-Stali season

Notable players
 Volodymyr Kilikevych  
 Mykyta Gavrylenko

Notes

External links
  Official website 
  Profile  at DiviziaNationala.com
  Statistics at Sports.md

Iskra-Stal Ribnita
Iskra-Stal Ribnita
2005 establishments in Moldova
Rîbnița
Iskra-Stal
FC Iskra-Stali